Seaside High School is a school located in Seaside, California.  The school first opened in September 1963 to sophomores and juniors (incoming seniors continued to attend Monterey High School until graduation), graduating its first class in June 1965.  Average annual enrollment is 1,400 students, attending grades 9–12.  The school serves the communities of Seaside, Monterey, Marina, Sand City, and Del Rey Oaks.  Its student body reflects the region's diversity of language, ethnicity, nationality, and cultures. The school mascot is the Spartan.

Athletics

Seaside High School has a very rich history in sports. The football team is consistently top ranked around Monterey County and has won two CCS titles. Along with the football team, Seaside High School offers many opportunities for students to display their unique athletic talents, including: basketball (boys and girls), cross country (boys and girls), volleyball (boys and girls), wrestling (boys and girls), soccer (boys and girls), baseball (boys), softball (girls), swimming and diving (boys and girls), track and field (boys and girls), and cheerleading.

Seaside High School's main rival is Monterey High School.

Notable alumni
 Ron Rivera, NFL player and coach; played for the Chicago Bears in the 1980s and served as the head coach for the Carolina Panthers and  Washington Football Team
 Mason Foster, former NFL linebacker for the Tampa Bay Buccaneers and Washington Redskins
 Tony Curtis, former NFL tight end for the Dallas Cowboys and Baltimore Ravens
 Heinz Insu Fenkl, award-winning writer, translator, professor and editor
 Bashir Levingston, former NFL player
 Herb Lusk, former NFL player
 Yūsaku Matsuda, actor
 LeCharls McDaniel, former NFL defensive back for the Washington Redskins and New York Giants
 Ty Powell, former NFL player

 Rachel Roy, fashion designer and philanthropist

References

External links
 Seaside High School official website
 Seaside High School profile provided by schooltree.org

Educational institutions established in 1963
High schools in Monterey County, California
Public high schools in California
1963 establishments in California